was a Japanese businessman, central banker, the 20th Governor of the Bank of Japan (BOJ).

Early life
Yamagiwa was born in Tokyo.

Career
Yamagiwa was Governor of the Bank of Japan from November 30, 1956, through December 17, 1964.

When the Japanese Cabinet accepted the Yamagiwa's resignation, his health was mentioned as the main reason for stepping down before the end of his second five-year term. At this time, the president of the Mitsubishi Bank, Makoto Usami, was already identified as successor.

Notes

References
 Werner, Richard A. (2003). Princes of the Yen: Japan's Central Bankers and the Transformation of the Economy. Armonk, New York: M.E. Sharpe. ;  OCLC 471605161

1901 births
1975 deaths
Governors of the Bank of Japan